Silver Summit is a ski area in Yellowhead County, Alberta, Canada. It is located 50 km (31 mi) north of the town of Edson on Highway 748. Silver Summit has three chairlifts, one Murry Latta double chairlift, one Doppelmayr T-Bar, and one Rope Tow servicing beginner runs. Silver Summit has seventeen ski trails: seven green, three blue, and seven black.

History

Silver Summit was conceived in the early 1960s by a group of local businessmen, who saw the need for a ski hill outside the Canadian Rockies. Rick Damm, a German former ski jumper, bought the ski resort in 1969. During the year of 1984, a ski jumping complex with K15, K30, and K50 hills were built, all in accordance with FIS standards. The ski jumping facility at Silver Summit opened October 1984 and was the only ski jumping facility until Canada Olympic Park was completed in Calgary. Although the ski jump towers have been demolished, the judge's tower still remains to this day.

References
Silver Summit Info
Ski Jumping Archive
Silver Summit 

Ski areas and resorts in Alberta
Yellowhead County